Sir Alexander James Edmund Cockburn, 12th Baronet (24 September 1802 – 20 November 1880) was a British jurist and politician who served as the Lord Chief Justice for 21 years. He heard some of the leading causes célèbres of the nineteenth century.

In 1847 he decided to stand for parliament, and was elected unopposed as Liberal Member of Parliament for Southampton. His speech in the House of Commons on behalf of the government in the Don Pacifico dispute with Greece commended him to Lord John Russell, who appointed him Solicitor-General in 1850 and Attorney General in 1851, a post which he held till the resignation of the ministry in February 1852.

Early life and career
Cockburn was born in Altona, in what is now Germany and was then part of Brandenburg, to Alexander Cockburn and his wife Yolande, daughter of René Michel de Vignier de La Saline, vicomte de Vignier, of Santo Domingo. His father served as British Consul to Hamburg and the Hanse towns and later as envoy extraordinary and minister plenipotentiary to Württemberg and the Republic of Colombia;<ref>The Foreign Office List and Diplomatic and Consular Year Book, vol. 10, 1857, pp. 35–6</ref> he was the fourth son of Sir James Cockburn, 8th Baronet (born c.1729, died July 1804), his three elder brothers having succeeded to the baronetcy, but died without heirs.

He was initially educated largely abroad and became fluent in French and familiar with German, Italian and Spanish. He was educated at Trinity Hall, Cambridge, gaining a first in Civil law in 1824–5 and graduating in 1829 with an LL.B. degree, and also being elected a fellow, and afterwards an honorary fellow. He entered the Middle Temple in 1825, and was called to the bar in 1829. He joined the western circuit and built up a substantial practice though he was sufficiently diffident about his success in London to devote little of his energies there, not even keeping his Chambers open.

As advocate (1832–1847)
Three years after his call, the Reform Bill was passed. Cockburn started to practise in election law, including acting for Henry Lytton Bulwer and Edward Ellice. In 1833, with William Rowe, he published a parliamentary brief on the decisions of election committees. In 1834, Ellice recommended Cockburn as member of the commission to enquire into the state of the corporations of England and Wales. Through his parliamentary work Cockburn met Joseph Parkes and himself became interested in politics as a profession in itself, not simply as a pretext for legal argument. Cockburn had become ambitious and in 1838 he turned down the offer of a judicial appointment in India with the sentiment "I am going in for something better than that". He became Recorder of Southampton and from that point started to reduce his election and parliamentary work in favour of more publicly notorious cases. In 1841 he was made a Q.C.

Trial of Dr Cockburn: In 1841 a charge of simony, brought against his uncle, William, Dean of York, enabled Cockburn to appear conspicuously in a case which attracted considerable public attention, the proceedings taking the form of a motion for prohibition duly obtained against the ecclesiastical court, which had deprived Dr Cockburn of his office.
Daniel McNaghten: Sir Robert Peel's secretary, Edward Drummond, was shot by Daniel McNaghten in 1843. Cockburn, briefed on behalf of the assassin, made a speech which helped to establish the insanity defence in Britain for the next century. At the trial, Cockburn had made extensive and effective use of Isaac Ray's Treatise on the Medical Jurisprudence of Insanity. Cockburn quoted extensively from the book which rejected traditional views of the insanity defence based on the defendant's ability to distinguish "right from wrong" in favour of a broader approach based on causation.Diamond (1956) Cockburn displayed a mastery of the scientific evidence and was an innovator in exploiting forensic science in court.
The winner of the 1844 Derby: In 1844, he appeared in Wood v. Peel to determine the winner of a bet (the Gaming Act 1845 deemed bets unenforceable in law) as to whether the Derby winner Running Rein was a four-year-old or a three-year-old. Running Rein could not be produced when the judge, Baron Alderson, demanded, and as a result Cockburn lost the case, while his strenuous advocacy of his client's cause had led him into making, in his opening speech, strictures on Lord George Bentinck's conduct in the case which should have been held back.Foulkes (2010)
Lieutenant Henry Hawkey: In 1846 Hawkey, an officer of the Royal Marines, was tried for murder at Winchester assizes after shooting James Alexander Seton in a duel; Cockburn secured Hawkey's acquittal. James Seton was the last British person to be killed in a duel in the United Kingdom.
The Achilli trial: During the short administration of Lord Derby, Cockburn was engaged against Sir Frederic Thesiger Attorney General at the time, and for John Henry Newman, in the case of a friar named Giacinto Achilli who had accused Newman of libel. The jury who heard the case under Lord Campbell found that Newman's plea of justification was not proved except in one particular, a verdict which, together with the methods of the judge and the conduct of the audience, attracted considerable comment.

As law officer of the Crown (1850–1856)
Lord John Russell appointed Cockburn as Solicitor-General in 1850, and as Attorney General in 1851, which latter post he held until the resignation of the ministry in February 1852. In December 1852, under Lord Aberdeen's ministry, Cockburn again became Attorney General, and remained so until 1856, taking part in many celebrated trials. In 1854 Cockburn was made Recorder of Bristol.

Cockburn shepherded through Parliament the Common Law Procedure Act 1852 and the Common Law Procedure Act 1854.

William Palmer: In his tenure as Attorney General from 1852 to 1856, he led for the crown in the trial of William Palmer of Rugeley in Staffordshire, an ex-medical man who poisoned a friend named Cook with strychnine in order to steal from his estate. Cockburn made an exhaustive study of the medical aspects of the case and won a conviction after a twelve-day trial, again demonstrating his skill with forensic science.
The Hopwood will case (1855).
The Swynfen will case (1856)Kingston (1923) pp169–170

As judge (1856–1880)
In 1856, he became Chief Justice of the Common Pleas. He inherited the baronetcy in 1858. In 1859, Lord Campbell became Lord Chancellor, and Cockburn became Lord Chief Justice of the Queen's Bench.

Cockburn always sought out the most sensational cases and was astute in rearranging his diary so that he could sit in any trial likely to attract the attention of the press.

Several Prime Ministers offered to nominate Cockburn for a peerage, and he finally accepted the offer in 1864.  However, Queen Victoria refused, noting that "this peerage has been more than once previously refused upon the ground of the notoriously bad moral character of the Chief Justice".

In 1875, the three English common law courts (the Queen's Bench, the Court of Common Pleas, and the Court of the Exchequer) merged to become divisions of the new High Court of Justice. The head of each court (Lord Chief Justice Cockburn, Chief Justice of the Common Pleas Lord Coleridge, and Chief Baron of the Exchequer Sir Fitzroy Kelly) continued in post. After the deaths of Kelly and Cockburn in 1880, the three divisions were merged into a single division, with Lord Coleridge as Lord Chief Justice of England.Martin v. Mackonachie: Cockburn sitting in the Queen's Bench division granted a writ to quash Lord Penzance's suspension of Alexander Heriot Mackonochie from his clerical office for breach of the Public Worship Regulation Act 1874. Cockburn's decision was overturned by the Court of Appeal.
The Tichborne Case: Cockburn presided over the civil case in which Arthur Orton attempted to establish his identity as the missing baronet Sir Roger Tichborne.  This trial collapsed after 103 days, the longest civil trial on record.  Cockburn then presided over the subsequent trial of Orton for perjury, a famous trial that lasted 188 days, setting a record for criminal trials, of which Cockburn CJ's summing-up occupied eighteen.Diamond (2004) 60–61R v. Hicklin: He developed the Hicklin test for obscenity.
The Alabama claims: He also played a role in the arbitration of the Alabama claims at Geneva in 1872, in which he represented the British government.  He dissented from the majority view as to British liability for the actions of British-built privateer ships.  He prepared the English translation of the arbitrators' award and published a controversial dissenting opinion in which he admitted British liability for the actions of the CSS Alabama, though not on the grounds given in the award, and discounted liability for the CSS Florida and CSS Shenandoah.
The Overend-Gurney fraud trial: the trial of the partners of Overend & Gurney, a bank that had collapsed in spectacular circumstances following precarious risks taken by the managers. In his summing up, Cockburn expressed the view that the defendants had been guilty of nothing more than "grave error".Woodley v. Metropolitan District Railway Co.: Woodley was set to repair a wall in a darkened railway tunnel in which trains continued to run, without warning or dedicated lookout, and with barely sufficient clearance between train and wall for the workman to make himself safe when a train passed. Woodley was seriously injured when he reached across the rail for a tool and was struck by a passing train. Cockburn CJ held that the employer was not liable, invoking the principle of volenti non-fit injuria.
Lavinia Ryves's claim to be the daughter of Prince Henry, Duke of Cumberland and Strathearn, a claim that ultimately failed after Cockburn CJ told the jury in summing up that Ryves's evidence comprised "outrages on all probability".
The trial of Michael Barrett for the Clerkenwell explosion.
The trial of Boulton and Park for transvestism and "conspiring and inciting persons to commit an unnatural offence".
The trial of Henry Wainwright for murder. The crime, in which Wainwright was arrested in possession of the dismembered body of his victim, was given more publicity at the time than those of Jack the Ripper.
The Eastbourne manslaughter

Personality
In personal appearance Cockburn was of small stature with a large head, but possessed a very dignified manner.  He enjoyed yachting and other sport, and writing (he wrote an unpublished novel). Something of an adventurer in his youth, he was fond of socialising and womanising, fathering two illegitimate children.  He "was also throughout his life addicted to frivolities not altogether consistent with advancement in a learned profession, or with the positions of dignity which he successively occupied." He lived for many years in some state at Wakehurst Place in Sussex. In his later years, he reminisced, "Whatever happens, I have had my whack". He once had to escape through the window of the robing room at Rougemont Castle, Exeter, to evade bailiffs. Shortly before he became Chief Justice of the Common Pleas, Cockburn was walking in London's Haymarket with fellow barrister William Ballantine when he saw a police constable roughly handling a woman. The pair stopped to protest but found themselves accused of obstructing a constable in the execution of his duty, arrested by the constable and conveyed to Vine Street Police Station. At the station they met an acquaintance who explained to the inspector who they were and they were released.

He was a passionate champion of the proper role of the advocate and on the occasion of a reception for Antoine Pierre Berryer in Middle Temple Hall, said:

As a judge he did not have the highest reputation, with a joke within the legal profession being that he became a first rate judge only because he sat with Lord Blackburn. Charles Francis Adams, Sr., a fellow judge on the Geneva tribunal to resolve the Alabama claims issue, felt that Sir Alexander's temper was so short that he seemed mentally unbalanced.

Family and decease
Although Cockburn never married, he had one acknowledged illegitimate son and one illegitimate daughter by the unmarried Amelia (Emily) Godfrey (17 September 1818, baptised 11 October 1818 All Saints' Church, Epping), the daughter of William Daniel Leake Godfrey (1788–1868) and his wife Louisa Hannah (née Dalley, 1791–1852):  born 3 August 1838; bapt 16 Jun 1839; father = Alexander Edmund Cockburn; mother = Emily CockburnLouisa Charlotte Cockburn (3 August 1838 Stratford, Essex baptised 16 June 1839 All Saints' Church, West Ham, Essex – Isle of Wight 25 April 1869GRO Register of Deaths – JUN 1869 2b 332 I WIGHT Aged 30), who married at Chelsea, London, on 25 June 1863 to the Rev. Charles William Cavendish (Chiswick 24 September 1822 – Ryde, Isle of Wight 21 December 1890), rector of Little Casterton, Rutland, later a Catholic convert who became secretary of the Society for the Propagation of the Faith, and a grandson of George Cavendish, 1st Earl of Burlington, with issue:Louis Francis John Charles Raphael Cavendish (24 October 1864 – 31 December 1890), who never married1881 Census for England: Aged 16 of Charlemont, Spencer Drive, Chiswick, London – RG11/1178 f.43 p. 37Alexander Dalton (Alex) Cockburn (Sydenham 1846 – Westminster 16 July 1887 ), Capt. 2nd Regt Life Guards, who never married1871 Census for England:  Cavalry Officer, unmarried aged 26, of Cavalry Barracks, Clewer, Berkshire – RG10/1302 f.89 p.1 – born Sydenham, SurreyNational Probate Calendar (Index of Wills and Administrations): Alexander Dalton Cockburn, Esq. ... formerly Captain in the 2nd Regiment of Life Guards who died 16 July 1887 at 59 Jermyn Street, London ...Probate 2 September 1887 and to whom Cockburn left the majority of his fortune. His son did not succeed him as Baronet of Langton, which became dormant.

Cockburn died on 20 November 1880, of angina pectoris at his house at 40 Hertford Street, Mayfair, London; he had continued working up until his death despite three heart attacks and warnings from his doctor. As he never married, he produced no legitimate heirs, despite having a surviving male child. As a result, the baronetcy became dormant upon his death. His remains were deposited in Catacomb A of Kensal Green Cemetery.

Ancestors

Arms

References

Bibliography

Obituaries:
The Times, 22 Nov 1880; 26 Nov 1880
Law Times, 27 Nov 1880, 68–9
Solicitors' Journal, 25''' (1880–81), 76–7

Lobban, M. (2004) "Cockburn, Sir Alexander James Edmund, twelfth baronet (1802–1880)", Oxford Dictionary of National Biography'', Oxford University Press, accessed 24 July 2007

External links

 

1802 births
1880 deaths
People from Sibiu County
Chief Justices of the Common Pleas
Presidents of the Cambridge Union
Cockburn, Alexander, 12th Baronet
Liberal Party (UK) MPs for English constituencies
UK MPs 1847–1852
UK MPs 1852–1857
Lord chief justices of England and Wales
Alumni of Trinity Hall, Cambridge
Attorneys General for England and Wales
Members of the Middle Temple
English barristers
English King's Counsel
Alexander
Members of the Privy Council of the United Kingdom
Knights Grand Cross of the Order of the Bath
Burials at Kensal Green Cemetery
Members of the Judicial Committee of the Privy Council
Members of the Parliament of the United Kingdom for Southampton